The Portland Guardian was a weekly newspaper published between 1842 and 1964 in the seaport town of Portland, Victoria, Australia. It was known as the Portland Guardian and Normanby General Advertiser from 1842 to 1876.

It was founded by Thomas Wilkinson and James Swords, and was the second newspaper to be launched in country Victoria. It was eventually absorbed by local rival Portland Observer, with the final issue appearing on 26 March 1964.

See also
 List of newspapers in Australia

References

External links 

Digitised World War I Victorian newspapers from the State Library of Victoria

Defunct newspapers published in Victoria (Australia)
1842 establishments in Australia
1964 disestablishments in Australia